Albert Alonzo Durham was the founder of Lake Oswego, Oregon. Durham operated a sawmill and a flour mill on Fanno Creek, which flows through the city of Durham, Oregon, from 1866 until his death in 1898. Durham, Oregon was named after Albert Durham during its incorporation in 1966.

References 

People from Lake Oswego, Oregon
1898 deaths